Plecostomus, pleco, or plec is the common name of several species of freshwater loricariid catfish commonly sold as aquarium fish. 

These include:

Hypostomus plecostomus
Hypostomus punctatus
Pterygoplichthys multiradiatus
Pterygoplichthys pardalis
Panaqolus maccus

It is also used as part of the common names of various similar species of loricariids.
The superficially similar loach Beaufortia kweichowensis is also sometimes known as the "butterfly plec", despite not being closely related to the Loracariidae.

See also
 Loricariidae
 Ancistrus, often incorrectly called "bristlenose pleco"